Bedhead was an American indie rock band, active from 1991 to 1998, based in Dallas, Texas. Members consisted of Matt and Bubba Kadane (vocals and guitar), Tench Coxe (guitar), Kris Wheat (bass), and Trini Martinez (drums). The band released several EPs and three LPs on Trance Syndicate, touring intermittently.  Bedhead's music was generally subdued, with three electric guitars and one electric bass guitar over sung or spoken vocals. Allmusic dubbed the group "the quintessential indie rock band," and Tiny Mix Tapes gave their final album Transaction de Novo a perfect 5/5 score.

In 1999, a year after the breakup of Bedhead, Matt and Bubba Kadane went on to form The New Year, a band with a style similar to Bedhead's.

History

Founding
The roots of the band trace back to brothers Matt and Bubba Kadane playing music together as children in Wichita Falls, Texas. They later began playing music together in Dallas, Texas.  Drummer Trini Martinez was the first addition to the duo's band in 1990, followed by guitarist Tench Coxe and bassist Kris Wheat. The band was formed into Bedhead in 1991. After playing their debut show in Austin in early 1992, they released two early singles on Dallas-based record label Direct Hit Records, one in 1992 and one in 1993.

WhatFunLifeWas (1994)

In 1993 the band came to the attention of King Coffey, drummer of the Butthole Surfers and founder of Trance Syndicate Records, who signed them to Trance Syndicate shortly after hearing them. Bedhead's debut album, WhatFunLifeWas, was released in 1994, to positive reviews. Sputnik Music gave WhatFunLifeWas 4/5 stars, and it received 4.5/5 stars from Allmusic.

Sputnik Music stated that the album's themes touch on loss and depression, "but with a sense of the profound. WhatFunLifeWas is a modest album; slow indie rock with a hint of the epic, that draws upon its broodiness to create a serenely personal atmosphere." Allmusic noted the band's careful use of both loud and soft dynamics, stating "The various comparisons to the Velvet Underground, Joy Division, and Spacemen 3 all make a certain sense, but...Bedhead have much more of an individual sensibility...rather than simply rehashing."

They released two EPs before their second full-length, Beheaded.  The first EP was a live recording taken on March 31, 1994, titled 4songCDEP19:10. The group launched its first expansive tour in the middle of 1995, and released the EP The Dark Ages in February 1996.Beheaded (1996)

Their second LP Beheaded was released on Trance Syndicate on October 24, 1996.  Beheaded received 4/5 stars from Allmusic, with a positive review stating, "at the heart of the band is an indie rock sound that can be traced back to the most pleasant material of the Velvet Underground. A trio of guitars lays down unexceptional, strummed accompaniments; vocalists employ a reserved sing-speak; the drummer maintains a lazy pulse. However, with Bedhead these elements are so perfectly executed that the music seems to play itself. Beheaded represents another stop on the road to slow-burning, soaring, indie rock/pop perfection."

Transaction de Novo (1998)

Their last LP, Transaction de Novo, was recorded by Steve Albini and released in 1998.  In a departure from their usual sound, Transaction De Novo featured more up-tempo, heavily distorted songs than its predecessors. Transaction de Novo received 4.5/5 stars from Allmusic, with a positive review stating "It's hard to imagine the group perfecting this sound much further." The album received a perfect 5/5 score from Tiny Mix Tapes.

After Bedhead
Bedhead broke up shortly after the release of Transaction De Novo, in 1998. After their breakup, the "Lepidoptera/Leper" 10" single was released in October 1998 on Trance Syndicate. This was followed by Macha Loved Bedhead, on April 25, 2000: a collaboration between the Kadane Brothers and Macha released on Jetset Records. After the band ended, guitarist Tench Coxe went on to earn a PhD in Russian Literature from Columbia University.

The New Year and Overseas

The Kadane brothers went on to form The New Year, and signed to Touch and Go Records. While still playing with The New Year, in 2012 Bubba and Matt Kadane formed Overseas with David Bazan of Pedro The Lion and Will Johnson of Centro-matic. Their debut album was released on June 11, 2013.

Style
Bedhead's music was generally subdued, with a polyphonic sound based on the interlocking of single-line melodies played by three electric guitars and one electric bass guitar (often played with a capo), nearly always using clean (undistorted) tones, prompting comparisons to the Velvet Underground.

According to Allmusic, "What distinguished [Bedhead] was the way it combined [indie rock]'s modest ambitions with careful song construction and rock & roll's sense of grand dynamic excitement. This was the quintessential indie rock band because it delivered some of the best the genre is capable of: workaday vocals that actually work, gorgeous melodies (though uncommercial, this music doesn't have to be indigestible), and dynamics that could crush the listener."

The group's vocals were often delivered in such a low key manner that they could be difficult to decipher.  This unusual sound was dubbed by some critics as "slo-core," referring to the slow tempos of many of the band's songs, though the band's members objected to the labeling in interviews. In reality, many of the group's songs only begin slow before building in speed, intensity and volume. Bedhead also experimented with time signatures less commonly used in rock music, by playing some songs in 7/8 or 5/4 meter.

Members
 Matt Kadane – guitar, vocals (1991–1998)
 Bubba Kadane – guitar, vocals (1991–1998)
 Tench Coxe – guitar (1991–1998)
 Kris Wheat – bass guitar (1991–1998)
 Trini Martinez – drums (1991–1998)

Discography
Studio albums

EPs

Singles

Compilations
1995: Cinco Anos compilation (Trance Syndicate) - track "The Dark Ages"

Unreleased
1995: Untitled Collection of Jazz Standards'' (Leaning House)

Covers

Further reading
Bedhead Biography at Allmusic

See also
The New Year

References

External links

American post-rock groups
Indie rock musical groups from Texas
Musical groups established in 1991
Musical groups disestablished in 1998
Musical groups from Dallas
Sadcore and slowcore groups
Trance Syndicate artists